The following is a list of people executed by the U.S. state of Texas between 1930 and 1939. During this period 122 people were executed by electrocution at the Huntsville Unit in Texas.

Executions 1930–1939

See also
Capital punishment in Texas

References

External links
Death Row 1923-1973. Texas Department of Criminal Justice

1930
20th-century executions by Texas
1930s-related lists
1930s in Texas